Paper Recordings is a Manchester record company that played a significant role in British club culture. It released contemporary electronic music from an international roster of recording artists integrating the genres of house, funk, jazz, techno and soul. Along with Nuphonic, Glasgow Underground Recordings and 20/20 Vision recordings, it is credited as one of the key labels that drove the popularity of the Nu-Disco genre in the late 1990s and 2000s.

History    
Founded in 1993 by Pete Jenkinson, Ben Davis, Miles Hollway, Elliot Eastwick, Andrew Gough and Stephen Page while all working at The Hacienda and Hard Times club nights. The label has commercially released over 2000 recordings, created by over 500 artists, producers, and remixers in over 50 countries across imprints Paper Recordings, Paper Disco, Paper Wave, Repap Records and We Are Woodville Records.

It released the debut album in 1997 from Tromsø band Those Norwegians, comprising Rune Lindbæk, Ole Johan Mjøs  and Torbjørn Brundtland who went on to form Röyksopp with Svein Berge. This album was titled Kaminsky Park, a pun on Comiskey Park that witnessed the Disco Demolition Night protests in 1979 and with its LP artwork depicting a burnt and warped 12" vinyl.

Notable musicians, artists and producers that have worked with the label includes Crazy P, Rasmus Faber, Xpress 2, Eddie 'Flashin' Fowlkes, Ashley Beedle, Greg Wilson, Silicone Soul, Ladytron, Kenny Hawkes, Two Lone Swordsmen (Andrew Weatherall and Keith Tennison), Derrick Carter, Håkan Lidbo, Andy Votel, Faze Action, Richard Norris, Matthew Herbert, Zed Bias, Ralph Myerz, Mike Lindsay (Tunng), Jane Weaver, Ian Pooley, Kathy Diamond, Anoraak, Bill Brewster and Mathias Stubø (Proviant Audio).

Robodisco 
Robodisco became Paper Recording's most recognised club night, hosting dance parties between 1996 and 2005 at venues including Sankeys Soap, Paradise Factory, Planet K, South Nightclub, PJ Bells, with associated nights Sonic Tonic, Out to Lunch at The Roadhouse and State respectively.

Paper Vision Films 
Pete Jenkinson and Ben Davis started a film production company in 2014 with their first project, the Northern Disco Lights - The Rise and Rise of Norwegian Dance Music investigating the emergence of the Nordic dance music scene premiering at Bergen International Film Festival in 2016. The documentary features interviews with Bryan Ferry, Lindstrøm, Annie, Per Martinsen, Prins Thomas, Bjørn Torske and Nemone.

The film has screened at over fifty international film festivals in cities including Tromsø, London, Oslo, Bergen, Kyiv, Svalbard, Berlin, Alaska, Copenhagen, Stockholm, Baku, Tbilisi, Turin, Prague and Manchester.

References

External links 
 Paper Recordings: Official label website
 Paper Vision Films: Official Film company website, Northern Disco Lights, Wild Water
 

British record labels
1993 establishments in the United Kingdom
Record labels established in 1993